P.S. 35 The Clove Valley School is a Public school in Staten Island, New York. 

The school is located near the foot of Grymes Hill. The school is a zoned school and has an enrollment of approximately 400 students a year from Kindergarten to fifth-grade.

P.S. 35 is continuously ranked as Staten Island's top-performing elementary school in the borough and it is ranked 10 out of 10 by GreatSchools.org, 85th out of 2,395 New York State elementary schools according to SchoolDigger and received an overall A Grade by Niche.

In 2016 the school also received the National Blue Ribbon recognition for academic excellence and student achievement.

References

Public elementary schools in Staten Island